Shrewsbury is a borough in York County, Pennsylvania, United States. The population was three thousand eight hundred and forty-eight at the time of the 2020 census. 

Shrewsbury is considered a borough and also has a bordering township. Neighbor towns of Shrewsbury are New Freedom, Pennsylvania and Glen Rock, Pennsylvania.

History
At one time, the land that is now Shrewsbury Borough was part of one large area called Shrewsbury Township. In 1797, Baltzer (Balthaser) Faust began to develop the village by laying out lots on both sides of Joppa Road (later the York-Baltimore Turnpike and now Main Street). The early settlers were mostly German and the town was called Strassburg, which means “the town by the street or road.” By 1830 there was enough of an influx of English people to reinstate “Shrewsbury” as the official name. On August 9, 1834, the Borough of Shrewsbury was incorporated by an Act of the General Assembly. The area delineated was approximately one mile long and one-half mile wide, stretching lengthwise along the turnpike, with the borough center located at the crossroads.
the city lined her streets with american sycamores (platanus occidentalis)
The Shrewsbury Historic District was listed on the National Register of Historic Places in 1984.

Geography
Shrewsbury is located at  (39.767127, -76.678965).

Demographics

As of the census of 2000, there were three thousand three hundred and seventy-eight people, one thousand three hundred and thirty households and nine hundred and forty-two families residing in the borough. 

The population density was 1,916.4 people per square mile (741.1/km2). There were one thousand three hundred and sixty-seven housing units at an average density of 775.5 per square mile (299.9/km2). 

The racial makeup of the borough was 97.48% White, 0.80% African American, 0.15% Native American, 0.77% Asian, 0.15% Pacific Islander, 0.27% from other races, and 0.38% from two or more races. Hispanic or Latino of any race were 0.98% of the population.

There were one thousand three hundred and thirty households, out of which 32.3% had children under the age of eighteen living with them; 61.4% were married couples living together, 7.1% had a female householder with no husband present, and 29.1% were non-families. 26.1% of all households were made up of individuals, and 14.6% had someone living alone who was sixty-five years of age or older. The average household size was 2.54 and the average family size was 3.08.

In the borough the population was spread out, with 25.7% under the age of eighteen, 6.0% from eighteen to twenty-four, 28.5% from twenty-five to forty-four, 26.2% from forty-five to sixty-four, and 13.6% who were sixty-five years of age or older. The median age was forty years. 

For every one hundred females there were 92.5 males. For every one hundred females aged eighteen and over, there were 88.7 males.

The median income for a household in the borough was $49,983, and the median income for a family was $57,358. Males had a median income of $39,107 compared with that of $32,196 for females. The per capita income for the borough was $20,292. 

Roughly 2.4% of families and 4.7% of the population were below the poverty line, including 1.5% of those under age eighteen and 15.2% of those aged sixty-five or over.

Education
Shrewsbury is located within the Southern York County School District, which includes Shrewsbury Elementary School, Southern Middle School and Susquehannock High School. Shrewsbury also has a public library, the Paul Smith Library of Southern York County

References

External links

Populated places established in 1800
Boroughs in York County, Pennsylvania
1800 establishments in Pennsylvania